Mi Ultima Cancion is an album by Peruvian singer Lucha Reyes, released on the FTA label (FLPS-126) in 1973. The album was produced by Viñico Tafur. It was Reyes' final album. She died in October 1973.

Track listing
Side A
 "Mi Ultima Canción" (Pedro Pacheco)
 "Quiero Pedirte Perdón" (Ana Renner)
 "Soy Tu Amante" (Rafael Amaranto)
 "Por Unos Ojazos Negros" (Pedro Espinel)
 "Tuya Es Mi Vida" (Juan Mosto Domecq)
 "Amor De Una Noche" (Pilar Quenés)

Side B 
 "Esclavitud" (Sixto Recavarren)
 "Asi Lo Quieres Tu" (Pedro Pacheco)
 "Siempre Te Amaré" (Pedro Pacheco)
 "Alla Estarás Conmigo" (Adrián Flores Albán)
 "Locura Y Pasión" (Germán Alva Orihuela)
 "Que Viva Chiclayo" (Luis Abelardo Núñez)

References

1973 albums
Spanish-language albums